Nether Skyborry is a Grade 2 listed country house (near to Skyborry Green) and lies within the parish of Llanfair Waterdine, South Shropshire.

Background 
The house has ancient origins; the original, smaller house, was built on part of the footprint of a 16th-century monastic building (part of which still remains). Nether Skyborry was extended, impressively, in the late 18th/early 19th century and once had seven bedrooms but, over the years, these have been reduced to a more manageable number. Nevertheless, the house still boasts no less than 13 chimneys!
There are four other houses close by (including the converted stables and coach house of Nether Skyborry) forming a small hamlet. 
The Welsh border lies very close - the River Teme runs to the south of the hamlet. The Welsh border is just on the other side of the river (but no longer follows the exact course of the river).

The name "Skyborry" is an anglicisation of the Welsh for barn, ysgubor. "Nether" is English and means near or under.

See also 
Skyborry

References

External links

Villages in Shropshire